Paralaudakia is a genus of lizards, commonly known as Asian rock agamas, which are endemic to Eurasia.

Taxonomy
All of the species of the genus Paralaudakia are sometimes included in the genus Laudakia, sensu lato. For African agamas see the genera Agama and Acanthocercus.

Species
Listed alphabetically by specific name.
Paralaudakia badakhshana  – Badakhshana rock agama
Paralaudakia bochariensis 
Paralaudakia caucasia  – Caucasian agama
Paralaudakia erythrogaster  – redbelly rock agama
Paralaudakia himalayana  – Himalayan agama
Paralaudakia lehmanni  – Turkestan agama
Paralaudakia microlepis  – small-scaled agama
Paralaudakia stoliczkana  – Mongolian rock agama

Nota bene: A binomial authority in parentheses indicates that the species was originally described in a genus other than Paralaudakia.

References

Further reading
Baig KJ, Wagner P, Ananjeva NB, Böhme W. 2012. A morphology-based taxonomic revision of Laudakia Gray, 1845 (Squamata: Agamidae). Vertebrate Zoology 62 (2): 213-260. (Paralaudakia, new genus, p. 229).

 
Lizard genera
Taxa named by Khalid Javed Baig
Taxa named by Philipp Wagner
Taxa named by Natalia B. Ananjeva
Taxa named by Wolfgang Böhme (herpetologist)